The Colorado State University Pueblo ThunderWolves (shortened to CSU Pueblo ThunderWolves in their athletics context) are the athletic teams at Colorado State University Pueblo. The ThunderWolves are a member of the Rocky Mountain Athletic Conference. They were previously known as the University of Southern Colorado Indians and then the University of Southern Colorado ThunderWolves. The program includes 7 men's sports: baseball, basketball, football, golf, soccer, tennis, and wrestling. The women's program has 8 sports: basketball, cross country, golf, soccer, softball, tennis, volleyball and track. Dropped following the 1984 season, football returned in 2008 and the team posted a 4–6 record. The ThunderWolves won the 2014 NCAA Division II Football National Championship, its first in football program history, by blanking previously undefeated Minnesota State University, Mankato 13–0.

Conference affiliations
 1938–39 to 1962–63 – NJCAA Independent
 1963–64 to 1966–67 – NAIA Independent
 1967–68 to 1971–72 – Rocky Mountain Athletic Conference - Plains Division
 1972–73 to 1975–76 – Great Plains Athletic Conference
 1976–77 to 1989–90 – Rocky Mountain Athletic Conference
 1990–91 to 1995–96 – Colorado Athletic Conference
 1996–97 to Present – Rocky Mountain Athletic Conference

History

1980s
In 1984, the school ended its football and baseball programs due to budget cuts.

1990s
In 1994, Dan DeRose, the athletic director, re-established the school's baseball program and had a new stadium complex built for baseball.

2000s
CSU Pueblo saw the return of football in 2008 with the construction and completion of its new football stadium, the Neta and Eddie DeRose ThunderBowl.

2010s to present
CSU Pueblo announced further restoration of athletic programs under new president Lesley Di Mare.

Mascot
The ThunderWolves mascot is Wolfie.

Football

References